Nijat Masood (born 30 December 1998) is an Afghan cricketer. He made his international debut for the Afghanistan cricket team in June 2022.

Career
He made his List A debut for Mis Ainak Region in the 2017 Ghazi Amanullah Khan Regional One Day Tournament on 10 August 2017. Prior to his List A debut, he was part of Afghanistan's squad for the 2016 Under-19 Cricket World Cup.

He made his first-class debut for Band-e-Amir Region in the 2017–18 Ahmad Shah Abdali 4-day Tournament on 20 October 2017, taking six wickets for 55 runs in the first innings.

In July 2018, he was the leading wicket-taker in the 2018 Ghazi Amanullah Khan Regional One Day Tournament, with thirteen dismissals in five matches. In September 2018, he was named in Kabul's squad in the first edition of the Afghanistan Premier League tournament.

He made his Twenty20 debut for the Boost Defenders in the 2018 Abu Dhabi T20 Trophy on 5 October 2018. He was the leading wicket-taker in the 2019 Afghanistan Provincial Challenge Cup, with seventeen dismissals in five matches. In November 2019, he was named in Afghanistan's squad for the 2019 ACC Emerging Teams Asia Cup in Bangladesh. Following a strong performance in the ACC Emerging Teams Asia Cup, he was named in Afghanistan's Test squad, for their one-off match against the West Indies.

In February 2022, he was named in Afghanistan's Twenty20 International (T20I) squad for their series against Bangladesh. In May 2022, he was named in Afghanistan's T20I squad for their series against Zimbabwe, and as a reserve in Afghanistan's One Day International (ODI) squad for the same tour. He made his T20I debut on 11 June 2022, for Afghanistan against Zimbabwe.

References

External links
 

1998 births
Living people
Afghan cricketers
Afghanistan Twenty20 International cricketers
Band-e-Amir Dragons cricketers
Kabul Zwanan cricketers
Mis Ainak Knights cricketers
Place of birth missing (living people)